Oochie Wally is a collaborative single by American rapper Nas and East Coast hip hop group Bravehearts. It was released on January 6, 2001, by Ill Will Records and Columbia Records as the second single for the compilation album Nas & Ill Will Records Presents QB's Finest (2000). The song is referenced in Jay-Z's diss song "Takeover". The female vocalist on the hook was later revealed to be Shelene Thomas.

Chart performance
"Oochie Wally" was a crossover hit in the U.S., peaking at number 26 on the Billboard Hot 100.

Remixes
In August 2018, the song's instrumental was used by American rapper J. Cole in "Album of the Year (Freestyle)". Following this, a freestyle was also released by British rapper SL and another one by British singer Stefflon Don.

Charts

Weekly charts

Year-end charts

References

2001 singles
Nas songs
Songs written by Nas
Dirty rap songs
Columbia Records singles